XHPSJI-FM is a radio station on 90.1 FM in San José Iturbide, Guanajuato. It is owned by GlobalMedia and carries the Los 40 franchise pop format.

History
XHPSJI was awarded in the IFT-4 radio auction of 2017. The station signed on in 2019.

References

Radio stations in Guanajuato
Radio stations established in 2019
2019 establishments in Mexico